Taqiabad (also Romanized as Taqīābād; also known as Taghi Abad Hoomeh Zarand) is a village in Mohammadabad Rural District, in the Central District of Zarand County, Kerman Province, Iran. At the 2006 census, its population was 619, in 147 families.

References 

Populated places in Zarand County